John Woodford (23 June 1881 – 1 May 1949) was an Australian cricketer. He played seven first-class cricket matches for Victoria between 1902 and 1913.

See also
 List of Victoria first-class cricketers

References

External links
 

1881 births
1949 deaths
Australian cricketers
Victoria cricketers
Cricketers from Melbourne